Knockdrin is a townland in County Westmeath, Ireland.

Knockdrin spans the civil parishes of Taghmon and Tyfarnham. It is one of the 11 townlands in Taghmon and one of the 11 townlands in Tyfarnham, both in the barony of Corkaree in the Province of Leinster.

The neighbouring townlands are: Garraree, Knockatee and Toberaquill to the north, Brittas to the east, Knockdrin Demesne to the south and
Kilmaglish to the north–west.

In the 1911 census of Ireland there were 8 houses and 39 inhabitants in the townland.

References

External links
Map of Knockdrin at openstreetmap.org
Knockdrin at the IreAtlas Townland Data Base
Knockdrin at Townlands.ie
Knockdrin at The Placenames Database of Ireland, Department of Arts, Heritage and the Gaeltacht

Townlands of County Westmeath